Leon Golzmann or as he was more commonly known, Dajos Béla (19 December 1897 – 5 December 1978), was a Russian jazz violinist and bandleader.

Career
Golzmann was born in Kyiv, now part of Ukraine, to a Russian father and Hungarian mother. He served as a soldier during World War I, after which he studied music in Moscow. He then continued his studies in Berlin, where he started playing in local venues. He was contacted by Carl Lindström AG to make recordings and started his own salon orchestra, at which period he changed his name to the more Hungarian-sounding Dajos Béla, Hungarian or Romanian music then being popular in Germany. Along with those of Paul Godwin and Marek Weber, his orchestra became one of the most popular in Germany and gained a high reputation abroad. He played a range of music, but for jazz music often recorded under different names, such as The Odeon Five, Mac’s Jazz Orchestra and the Clive Williams Jazzband.

As soon as the Nazis came to power in Germany in 1933 Béla, who was Jewish, started touring abroad. In 1935 he travelled to Buenos Aires, where he remained for the rest of his life. He died in La Falda, Argentina, in 1978.

Select discography
 Waitin' For The Moon / Adieu, Mimi (Shimmy) (Odeon 0-1921),
 Humming / Bummel-Petrus (Intermezzo) (Odeon A 71942), 1921
 Radio-Tango / Opern-Foxtrott in Potpourri-Form (Odeon 49039), 1925
 (as Kapelle Merton): Dinah / Sevilla (Beka B.6071), 1926
 Who ? ("Du ! Wann bist du bei mir ?") / Zwei rote Rosen, ein zarter Kuss (Odeon 0-2087), Januar 1927
 Heinzelmännchens Wachtparade / Dornröschens Brautfahrt (Odeon 0-2101), 1927
 Santa Lucia / Venezia (Odeon 0-2122), 1927
 Hund och Katt / Ref. sång (Odeon D-4948), 1929
 Kennst du das kleine Haus am Michigansee / Anna Aurora (Odeon D-4975), 1929
 (as Odeon-Tanz-Orchester und Gesang): In Sanssouci, dort wo die alte Mühle steht (Odeon O-11301), 1929
 (with Leo Frank (singer)): Im Rosengarten von Sanssouci, 1930
In addition, he made around 70 records with the tenor Richard Tauber (1891-1948) as violin soloist or orchestra director.

Sources
 Lyman, Darryl. Great Jews in Music, J. D. Publishers, 1986.
 Sadie, Stanley. The new Grove dictionary of music and musicians, Macmillan, 1980.
 Wolfram Knauer (1986, Pb.): Jazz in Deutschland. Darmstädter Beiträge zur Jazzforschung 5. Hofheim : Wolke Verlag (in German)

References

External links 
 Center for Jazz Arts Exhibition
 

1897 births
1978 deaths
Musicians from Kyiv
People from Kiev Governorate
Ukrainian Jews
Soviet expatriates in Germany
Jewish emigrants from Nazi Germany to Argentina
20th-century jazz composers
20th-century Ukrainian musicians
Jewish composers
Ukrainian composers